Pennahatchee Creek is a stream in the U.S. state of Georgia. It is a tributary to Turkey Creek.

Pennahatchee is a name derived from the Creek language meaning "turkey".

References

Rivers of Georgia (U.S. state)
Rivers of Dooly County, Georgia